Lukáš Dryml (born 16 April 1981 in Pardubice, Czechoslovakia) is a former international motorcycle speedway rider from the Czech Republic, who represented the Czech Republic speedway team in the Speedway World Cup.

Career
Dryml and his older brother Aleš Dryml Jr. were introduced to speedway by their father Aleš Dryml Sr., who was a former international speedway rider.

Dryml came to the British speedway leagues in 2000 when he and his brother Ales joined the Oxford Cheetahs for the 2002 Elite League speedway season. The pair came into the Oxford side relatively unknown because they had only ridden in the Czech Republic and Poland at the time. Lukas had won the European U-19 Championship. However, the British Authorities gave them inflated averages of 7.50 and 5.00, which would not help Oxford's 2000 league challenge as they finished second from last. Dryml went on to win to become the World Under-21 Champion in 2002.

The following season in 2001, Oxford brought in Leigh Adams as heat leader and retained the Dryml brothers on reduced averages, this combination was a winning one, as the three riders were instrumental in helping Oxford win the 2001 Elite League.

He has twice won the European Pairs Championship (2004 and 2007) with brother  Aleš Jr. He will return to the Speedway Grand Prix series in 2008 after finishing second in the 2008 Speedway Grand Prix Qualification tournament.

Dryml signed a temporary contract to ride for the Eastbourne Eagles in 2009 after the Eagles encountered difficulties obtaining a British work permit for Russian rider Denis Gizatullin.

Speedway Grand Prix results

Career summary

World Under-21 Championship
2001 - Silver medal (11 points)
2002 - World Champion (14+3 points)

Speedway World Cup
2002 - 5 place (14 points)
2003 - 6 place (10 points in Race-Off)
2004 - 6 place (5 points in Race-Off)
2005 - 6 place (7 points in Race-Off)
2007 - 9 place (13 points in Qualifying Round 2)

European Under-19 Championship
1999 - 6 place (11 points)
2000 - European Champion (13 points)

European Pairs Championship
2004 - European Champion (track reserve in Final)
2005 - Silver medal (track reserve in Final)
2006 - 4 place (12 points in Semi-Final A)
2007 - European Champion ( points)

See also 
List of Speedway Grand Prix riders
Czech Republic speedway team

References

1981 births
Living people
Czech speedway riders
Individual Speedway Junior European Champions
European Pairs Speedway Champions
Oxford Cheetahs riders
Peterborough Panthers riders
Poole Pirates riders
Sportspeople from Pardubice